Kardashev can refer to:

Nikolai Kardashev (1932–2019), a Russian and Soviet astrophysicist.
The Kardashev scale, a scale measuring the technological growth of civilization, named after him.
Kardashev, a progressive death metal band from the United States
The Kardashev Scale (album), album by rapper Greydon Square